Tanya Kalounivale (born 20 January 1999) is a Fijian-born New Zealand rugby union player. She plays at tighthead prop for Waikato and Hamilton Old Boys. She was part of the Black Ferns champion 2021 Rugby World Cup squad. She plays for Chiefs Manawa in the Super Rugby Aupiki competition.

Rugby career 
Kalounivale attended Suva Grammar School in Fiji. She made her debut for Waikato in 2017.

2021 
In May 2021, Kalounivale played for the Chiefs against the Blues in the first-ever women's Super Rugby match at Eden Park, the Chiefs won 39–12. In November, she was named in the Chiefs squad for the inaugural season of Super Rugby Aupiki.

Kalounivale was selected for the Black Ferns squad to tour England and France, although she did not play in any matches.

2022 
Kalounivale made her international debut on 6 June against Australia at Tauranga at the 2022 Pacific Four Series. She scored a try on debut which was later ruled out.

In August, She was named in the team again for a two-test series against the Wallaroos for the Laurie O'Reilly Cup. She was selected for the Black Ferns 2021 Rugby World Cup 32-player squad.

2023 
Kalounivale scored her first Super Rugby Aupiki try in Chiefs Manawa's opening round victory against Hurricanes Poua.

References

External links 

 Black Ferns Profile

1999 births
Living people
New Zealand female rugby union players
New Zealand women's international rugby union players